Baldo Baldi (19 February 1888 – 21 December 1961) was an Italian fencer. He won a gold medal in the team foil and sabre events at the 1920 Summer Olympics.

References

External links
 
 

1888 births
1961 deaths
Italian male fencers
Olympic fencers of Italy
Olympic gold medalists for Italy
Olympic medalists in fencing
Fencers at the 1920 Summer Olympics
Medalists at the 1920 Summer Olympics
Sportspeople from Livorno